Euryomyrtus is a genus of shrubs, in the family Myrtaceae, all of which are endemic to Australia.

Species include:
Euryomyrtus denticulata (Maiden & Betche) Trudgen 
Euryomyrtus inflata Trudgen 
Euryomyrtus leptospermoides (C.A.Gardner) Trudgen 
Euryomyrtus maidenii (Ewart & Jean White) Trudgen
Euryomyrtus patrickiae Trudgen
Euryomyrtus ramosissima (A.Cunn.) Trudgen - Rosy baeckea
Euryomyrtus recurva Trudgen

Distribution
Species within this genus are found in Western Australia, South Australia, New South Wales, Australian Capital Territory, Victoria and Tasmania.

References

 

 
Myrtales of Australia
Myrtaceae genera
Endemic flora of Australia